Lahaina Historic District is a National Historic Landmark District encompassing most of the community of Lahaina, Hawaii, on the west side of the island of Maui in the US state of Hawaii.  Designated in 1962, the district recognizes Lahaina for its well-preserved character as a 19th-century port, and for its social and economic importance in the 19th century as a major whaling center in the Pacific, and as one of the capital cities of the Kingdom of Hawaii.

Donn Beach and Pete Wimberly played an important early role in establishing building ordinances to govern restoration and preservation projects in Lahaina. It was declared a National Historic Landmark in 1962.  The district is bounded on the north by Puuona Point, the south by Makila Point, and the east by the ridge of hills above the town.  Its western bound extends all the way out to the island of Lānaʻi, encompassing the Lahaina Roads, the roadstead which enabled the town's growth in the 19th century.

Lahaina was a popular residential center for the kings of Maui prior to the arrival of European explorers in the late 18th century.  Kamehameha I made his landing here when he began the conquest of Maui in 1795, and Kamehameha II established a residence here in 1819.  That same year, the first whaling ships arrived, beginning the community's rise in economic importance.  Lahaina eclipsed Oahu as a preferred whaling port between 1840 and 1855, because of its better deep-water anchorage.  When Kamehameha III ascended to the Hawaiian throne in 1825, he made Lahaina his capital, preferring it to the busier Honolulu.  The town declined in economic importance in the 1860s, as the whaling industry waned.

Buildings
When the landmark district was designated in 1962, nine buildings were called out for their specific contribution to the district:

Gallery

References

External links

Lahaina Restoration Foundation

Historic districts on the National Register of Historic Places in Hawaii
National Historic Landmarks in Hawaii
History of Maui
Historic American Buildings Survey in Hawaii
Protected areas established in 1962
1962 establishments in Hawaii
National Register of Historic Places in Maui County, Hawaii
Hawaii Register of Historic Places